The 1936 Summer Olympics (German: Olympische Sommerspiele 1936), officially known as the Games of the XI Olympiad (German: Spiele der XI. Olympiade) and commonly known as Berlin 1936, were an international multi-sport event held from 1 to 16 August 1936 in Berlin, Germany. Berlin won the bid to host the Games over Barcelona at the 29th IOC Session on 26 April 1931. The 1936 Games marked the second and most recent time the International Olympic Committee gathered to vote in a city that was bidding to host those Games. Later rule modifications forbade cities hosting the bid vote from being awarded the games.

To outdo the 1932 Los Angeles Games, Reich Führer Adolf Hitler had a new 100,000-seat track and field stadium built, as well as six gymnasiums and other smaller arenas. The Games were the first to be televised, with radio broadcasts reaching 41 countries. Filmmaker Leni Riefenstahl was commissioned by the German Olympic Committee to film the Games for $7 million. Her film, titled Olympia, pioneered many of the techniques now common in the filming of sports.

Hitler saw the 1936 Games as an opportunity to promote his government and ideals of racial supremacy and antisemitism, and the official Nazi Party paper, the Völkischer Beobachter, wrote in the strongest terms that Jews should not be allowed to participate in the Games. German Jewish athletes were barred or prevented from taking part in the Games by a variety of methods, although some women swimmers from the Jewish sports club Hakoah Vienna did participate. Jewish athletes from other countries were said to have been side-lined to avoid offending the Nazi regime.

Total ticket revenues were 7.5 million Reichsmark, generating a profit of over one million R.M. The official budget did not include outlays by the city of Berlin (which issued an itemized report detailing its costs of 16.5 million R.M.) or outlays of the German national government (which did not make its costs public, but is estimated to have spent US$30 million).

Jesse Owens of the United States won four gold medals in the sprint and long jump events, and became the most successful athlete to compete in Berlin, while Germany was the most successful country overall with 89 medals total, with the United States coming in second with 56 medals. These were the final Olympic Games under the presidency of Henri de Baillet-Latour and the final Games for 12 years due to the disruption of the Second World War. The next Olympic Games were held in 1948 (the Winter Games in St. Moritz, Switzerland and then the Summer Games in London, England).

Host city selection 
At the 28th IOC Session, held during 1930, in Berlin, 14 cities announced their intention to bid to host the 1936 Summer Olympic Games. The bidding for these Olympic Games was the first to be contested by IOC members casting votes for their own favorite host cities.

The vote occurred on 26 April 1931, at the 29th IOC Session held in Barcelona, Spain that year. The vote was held 69 days after the declaration of the Second Spanish Republic and during the final years of the Weimar Republic. This was two years before Adolf Hitler and the Nazi Party rose to power in Germany, in 1933.

By the time of the 1931 IOC Session, only Barcelona and Berlin were left in contention for the delegate vote. Rome withdrew on the eve of the vote. How other candidates withdrew is unclear, as is the seriousness of intent behind all of the listed candidate cities. The other cities who announced an intention to hold the games, but which withdrew from the race, were Alexandria, Budapest, Buenos Aires, Cologne, Dublin, Frankfurt, Helsinki, Lausanne, Montevideo, Nuremberg, Rio de Janeiro, and Rome. Helsinki, Rome, Barcelona and Rio de Janeiro would go on to host the Olympic Games in 1952, 1960, 1992 and 2016, respectively.

The selection procedure marked the second and final time that the International Olympic Committee would gather to vote in a city which was bidding to host those Games. The only other time this occurred was at the inaugural IOC Session in Paris, France, on 24 April 1894. Then, Athens and Paris were chosen to host the 1896 and 1900 Games, respectively.

The city of Barcelona held a multi-sport festival at the same time as the 1931 IOC Session. This included a football match between Spain and the Irish Free State, which was watched by 70,000 spectators. The political uncertainty around the declaration of the Second Spanish Republic, which had happened days before the IOC Session, was likely to have been a greater factor in the decision taken by delegates regarding the host city for 1936. Berlin prevailed.

After the Nazis took control of Germany, and began instituting anti-Semitic policies, the IOC held private discussions among its delegates about changing the decision to hold the Games in Berlin. However, Hitler's regime gave assurances that Jewish athletes would be allowed to compete on a German Olympic team. One year before the games, the American Olympic Association suggested to change the venue to Rome; they saw Rome as a good replacement because Rome was originally selected to hold the 1908 Summer Olympics.

Organization 
Hans von Tschammer und Osten, as Reichssportführer (i.e., head of the Deutscher Reichsbund für Leibesübungen (DRL), the Reich Sports Office, played a major role in the structure and organisation of the Olympics. He promoted the idea that the use of sports would harden the German spirit and instill unity among German youth. At the same time he also believed that sports was a "way to weed out the weak, Jewish, and other undesirables".

Von Tschammer trusted the details of the organisation of the games to Theodor Lewald and Carl Diem, the former president and secretary of the Deutscher Reichsausschuss für Leibesübungen, the forerunner of the Reich Sports Office. Among Diem's ideas for the Berlin Games was the introduction of the Olympic torch relay between Greece and the host nation.

Torch relay 

The 1936 Summer Olympics torch relay was the first of its kind, following on from the reintroduction of the Olympic Flame at the 1928 Games. It pioneered the modern convention of moving the flame via a relay system from Greece to the Olympic venue. Leni Riefenstahl filmed the relay for the 1938 film Olympia.

Broadcasting 
The games were the first to have live television coverage. The German Post Office, using equipment from Telefunken, broadcast over 70 hours of coverage to special viewing rooms throughout Berlin and Potsdam and a few private TV sets, transmitting from the Paul Nipkow TV Station. They used three different types of TV cameras, so blackouts would occur when changing from one type to another.

Olympic village 
The 1936 Olympic village was located at Elstal in Wustermark (at ), on the western edge of Berlin. Its layout was designed and construction overseen by appointed village commander Hauptmann Wolfgang Fürstner beginning in 1934. Less than two months before the start of the Olympic Games, Fürstner was abruptly demoted to vice-commander, and replaced by Oberstleutnant Werner von Gilsa, commander of the Berlin Guard-Regiment. The official reason for the replacement was that Fürstner had not acted "with the necessary energy" to prevent damage to the site as 370,000 visitors passed through it between 1 May and 15 June. However, this was just a cover story to explain the sudden demotion of the half-Jewish officer. The 1935 Nuremberg Laws, passed during the period Fürstner was overseeing the Olympic Village, had classified him as a Jew, and as such, the career officer was to be expelled from the Wehrmacht. Two days after the conclusion of the Berlin Olympics, vice-commander Fürstner had been removed from active Wehrmacht duty, and committed suicide because he realised he had no future under the Nazis.

After the completion of the Olympic Games, the village was repurposed for the Wehrmacht into the Olympic Döberitz Hospital, and Army Infantry School, and was used as such through the Second World War. In 1945 it was taken over by the Soviet Union and became a military camp of the union occupation forces. Late 20th-century efforts were made to restore parts of the former village, but little progress was made. More recently, the vast majority of the land of the Olympic village has been managed by the DKB Foundation, with more success; efforts are being made to restore the site into a living museum. The dormitory building used by Jesse Owens, Meissen House, has been fully restored, with the gymnasium and swimming hall partially restored. Seasonally, tours are given daily to small groups and students.

The site remains relatively unknown even in Germany, but some tournaments are held at the site in an effort to boost knowledge of the venues.

Venues 

Twenty-two venues were used for the 1936 Summer Olympics. Many were located in the Reich Sportsfeld complex.

Sailing was held in the Bay of Kiel, which would serve as the sailing venue for the 1972 Summer Olympics held in Munich. The Olympic Stadium would later be part of two FIFA World Cups and then host an IAAF World Championships in Athletics along with undergoing a renovation in the early 2000s to give new life to the stadium. Avus Motor Road (AVUS) was started in 1907, but was not completed until 1921 due to World War I. The track was rebuilt for the 1936 Games. AVUS continued being used after World War II though mainly in Formula 2 racing. The German Grand Prix was last held at the track in 1959. Dismantling of the track first took place in 1968 to make way for a traffic crossing for touring cars that raced there until 1998.

BSV 92 Field was first constructed in 1910 for use in football, handball, athletics, and tennis. The Reich Sports Field, which consisted of the Olympic Stadium, the Dietrich Eckert Open-Air Theatre, the Olympic Swimming Stadium, Mayfield, the Hockey Stadiums, the Tennis Courts, and the Haus des Deutschen Sports, was planned for the aborted 1916 Summer Olympics, but was not completed until 1934. Mayfield was the last venue completed prior to the 1936 Games in April 1936. Deutschland Hall was opened in 1935. Mommenstadion opened in 1930. Basketball was held outdoors at the request of the International Basketball Federation (FIBA). The tennis courts were used, which turned to mud during heavy rain at the final. The K-1 1000 m canoeing final was also affected by heavy rain at Grünau that included thunder and lightning. During World War II, Deutschlandhalle suffered heavy aerial bombing damage. After the second world war, the hall was reconstructed and expansion has continued . The Deutschlandhalle in Berlin, where the boxing, weightlifting, and wrestling events took place, was used as a venue, but was increasingly closed for repairs, last in 2009 when it was close for repairs, It was demolished in December 2011. the Mommsenstadion was renovated in 1987 and was still in use in 2010.

The Olympic Stadium was used as an underground bunker in World War II as the war went against Nazi Germany's favor. The British reopened the Stadium in 1946 and parts of the stadium were rebuilt by the late 1950s. As a host venue for the 1974 FIFA World Cup, the stadium had its roof partially covered on the North and South Stands. British occupation of the stadium ended in 1994. Restoration was approved in 1998 with a contractor being found to do the work in 2000. This restoration ran from 2000 to 2004. The modernized Stadium reopened in 2004, with a capacity of 74,228 people. The seating has been changed greatly, especially the sections that were reserved for German and international political leaders. The stadium now plays host to Hertha BSC (1963–present), and is expected to remain the home of the team for years to come. For the 2006 FIFA World Cup, the venue was where the final took place between Italy and France. Three years later, the venue hosted the World Athletics Championships.

Games

Opening ceremony 

The opening ceremony was held at the Berlin Olympic Stadium on 1 August 1936. A flyover by the German airship Hindenburg flying the Olympic flag behind it was featured early in the opening ceremonies. After the arrival of Hitler and his entourage, the parade of nations proceeded, each nation with its own unique costume. As the birthplace of the Olympics, Greece entered the stadium first. The host nation, Germany, entered last. Some nations' athletes purposefully gave the Nazi salute as they passed Hitler. Others gave the Olympic salute (a similar one, given with the same arm), or a different gesture entirely, such as hats-over-hearts, as the United States, India, and China did. All nations lowered their flags as they passed the Führer, save the United States, the United Kingdom, Switzerland and the Commonwealth of the Philippines. (The United States doing this was explained later as an army regulation.) Writer Thomas Wolfe, who was there, described the opening as an "almost religious event, the crowd screaming, swaying in unison and begging for Hitler. There was something scary about it; his cult of personality."

After a speech by the president of the German Olympic Committee, the games were officially declared open by Adolf Hitler who quoted (in German): "I proclaim open the Olympic Games of Berlin, celebrating the Eleventh Olympiad of the modern era." Hitler opened the games from his own box, on top of others. Writer David Wallechinsky has commented on the event, saying, "This was his event, he wanted to be glorified."

Although the Olympic flame was first introduced in the 1928 Summer Olympics in Amsterdam, this was the first instance of the torch relay. The Nazis invented the concept of the torch run from ancient Olympia to the host city. Thus as swimmer Iris Cummings later related, "once the athletes were all in place, the torch bearer ran in through the tunnel to go around the stadium". A young man chosen for this task ran up the steps all the way up to the top of the stadium there to light a cauldron which would start this eternal flame that would burn through the duration of the games.

But in spite of all the pomp and ceremony, and the glorification of Hitler, all did not go according to plan, and there was a rather humorous aspect in the opening ceremony. U.S. distance runner Louis Zamperini, one of the athletes present, related it on camera:

Events 
129 events in 25 disciplines, comprising 19 sports, were part of the Olympic program in 1936. The number of events in each discipline is noted in parentheses.

 Aquatics
 
 
 
 
 
 
 
 
 Road (2)
 Track (4)
 
 Dressage (2)
 Eventing (2)
 Show jumping (2)
 
 
 
 
 
 
 
 
 
 
 
 
 Freestyle (7)
 Greco-Roman (7)

Basketball, canoeing, and handball made their debut at the Olympics. Handball did not appear again on the program until the next German summer Olympic games in Munich in 1972. Demonstration sports were Art, Baseball, Gliding, and Wushu. A team from India gave demonstrations of Kabaddi, Mallakhamb and other traditional Indian sports but were not part of India's official Olympic contingent.

Notable achievements 
Germany had a successful year in the equestrian events, winning individual and team gold in all three disciplines, as well as individual silver in dressage. In the cycling match sprint finals, the German Toni Merkens fouled Arie van Vliet of the Netherlands. Instead of being disqualified, he was fined 100 ℛℳ and kept his gold. German gymnasts Konrad Frey and Alfred Schwarzmann both won three gold medals.

American Jesse Owens won four gold medals in the sprint and long jump events. His German competitor Luz Long offered Owens advice after he almost failed to qualify in the long jump and was posthumously awarded the Pierre de Coubertin medal for sportsmanship. Mack Robinson, brother of Jackie Robinson, won the 200-meter sprint silver medal behind Owens by 0.4 seconds. Although he did not win a medal, future American war hero Louis Zamperini, lagging behind in the 5,000-meter final, made up ground by clocking a 56-second final lap. In one of the most dramatic 800-meter races in history, American John Woodruff won gold after slowing to jogging speed in the middle of the final in order to free himself from being boxed in. Glenn Edgar Morris, a farm boy from Colorado, won gold in the decathlon. British rower Jack Beresford won his fifth Olympic medal in the sport, and his third gold medal. The U.S. eight-man rowing team from the University of Washington won the gold medal, coming from behind to defeat the Germans and Italians with Hitler in attendance. 13-year-old American sensation Marjorie Gestring won the women's 3 meter diving event.

Jack Lovelock of New Zealand won the 1500 m gold medal, coming through a strong field to win in world record time of 3:47.8.

In the marathon, the ethnic Koreans Sohn Kee-chung and Nam Sung-yong won one gold and one bronze medal; as Korea was annexed by Japan at the time, they were running for Japan.

India won the gold medal in the field hockey event once again (they won the gold in all Olympics from 1928 to 1956), defeating Germany 8–1 in the final. However, Indians were officially considered Indo-Aryans by the Germans so there was no controversy regarding the victory. Rie Mastenbroek of the Netherlands won three gold medals and a silver in swimming. Estonia's Kristjan Palusalu won gold medals in both Men's heavyweight Wrestling styles, marking the last time Estonia competed as an independent nation in the Olympics until 1992.

After winning the middleweight class, the Egyptian weightlifter Khadr El Touni continued to compete for another 45 minutes, finally exceeding the total of the German silver medalist by 35 kg. The 20-year-old El Touni lifted a total of 387.5 kg, crushing two German world champions and breaking the then-Olympic and world records, while the German lifted 352.5 kg. Furthermore, El Touni had lifted 15 kg more than the light-heavyweight gold medalist, a feat only El Touni has accomplished. El Touni's new world records stood for 13 years. Fascinated by El Touni's performance, Adolf Hitler rushed down to greet this human miracle. Prior to the competition, Hitler was said to have been sure that Rudolf Ismayr and Adolf Wagner would embarrass all other opponents. Hitler was so impressed by El Touni's domination in the middleweight class that he ordered a street named after him in Berlin's Olympic village. The Egyptian held the No. 1 position on the IWF list of history's 50 greatest weightlifters for 60 years, until the 1996 Games in Atlanta where Turkey's Naim Süleymanoğlu surpassed him to top the list.

Italy's football team continued their dominance under head coach Vittorio Pozzo, winning the gold medal in these Olympics between their two consecutive World Cup victories (1934 and 1938). Much like the successes of German athletes, this triumph was claimed by supporters of Benito Mussolini's regime as a vindication of the superiority of the fascist system. Austria won the silver; a controversial win after Hitler called for a rematch of the quarterfinals match to discount Peru's 4–2 win over Austria. The Peruvian national Olympic team refused to play the match again and withdrew from the games. In the quarter-finals of the football tournament, Peru beat Austria 4–2 in extra-time. Peru rallied from a two-goal deficit in the final 15 minutes of normal time. During extra-time, Peruvian fans allegedly ran onto the field and attacked an Austrian player. In the chaos, Peru scored twice and won, 4–2. However, Austria protested and the International Olympic Committee ordered a replay without any spectators. The Peruvian government refused and their entire Olympic squad left in protest as did Colombia.

A remarkable story from the track and field competition was the gold medal won by the US women's 4 × 100 m relay team. The German team were the heavy favourites, but dropped the baton at one hand-off. Of notable interest on the US team was Betty Robinson. She was the first woman ever awarded an Olympic gold medal for track and field, winning the women's 100 m event at the 1928 Summer Olympics in Amsterdam. In 1931, Robinson was involved in a plane crash, and was severely injured. Her body was discovered in the wreckage and it was wrongly thought that she was dead. She was placed in the trunk of a car and taken to an undertaker, where it was discovered that she was not dead, but in a coma. She awoke from the coma seven months later, although it was another six months before she could get out of a wheelchair, and two years before she could walk normally again. Due to the length of her recovery, she had to miss participating in the 1932 Summer Olympics in Los Angeles, in her home country.

Participating nations 
A total of 49 nations attended the Berlin Olympics, up from 37 in 1932. Five nations made their first official Olympic appearance at these Games: Afghanistan, Bermuda, Bolivia, Costa Rica and Liechtenstein.

 , also took part in the Opening Ceremony, but its only athlete (a weightlifter) did not compete.

Medal count 

The ten nations that won most medals at the 1936 Games.

Controversies 
Hitler saw the Games as an opportunity to promote his government and ideals of racial supremacy. The official Nazi party paper, the Völkischer Beobachter, wrote in the strongest terms that Jewish and black people should not be allowed to participate in the Games. However, when threatened with a boycott of the Games by other nations, he relented and allowed black and Jewish people to participate, and added one token participant to the German team—a Jewish woman, Helene Mayer. In an attempt to "clean up" the host city, the German Ministry of the Interior authorized the chief of police to arrest all Romani and keep them in a "special camp", the Berlin-Marzahn concentration camp.

Political aspects 

United States Olympic Committee president Avery Brundage became a main supporter of the Games being held in Germany, arguing that "politics has no place in sport", despite having initial doubts.

French Olympians gave a Roman salute at the opening ceremony: known as the salut de Joinville per the battalion, Bataillon de Joinville, the Olympic salute was part of the Olympic traditions since the 1924 games. However, due to the different context this action was mistaken by the crowd for a support to fascism, the Olympic salute was discarded after 1946.

Although Haiti attended only the opening ceremony, an interesting vexillological fact was noticed: its flag and the flag of Liechtenstein were coincidentally identical, and this was not discovered until then. The following year, a crown was added to Liechtenstein's to distinguish one flag from the other.

Marty Glickman and Sam Stoller were originally slated to compete in the American 4x100 relay team but were replaced by Jesse Owens and Ralph Metcalfe prior to the start of the race. There were speculations that their Jewish heritage contributed to the decision "not to embarrass the German hosts"; however, given that African-Americans were also heavily disliked by the Nazis, Glickman and Stoller's replacement with black American athletes does not support this theory. Others said that they were in a better physical condition, and that was the main reason behind the replacement.

In 1937, 20th Century Fox released the film Charlie Chan at the Olympics. The plot concerned members of the Berlin police force helping the Chinese detective apprehend a group of spies (of unnamed nationality) trying to steal a new aerial guidance system. Despite pertaining to the Berlin Olympics, actual Games' footage used by the filmmakers was edited to remove any Nazi symbols.

After the Olympics, Jewish participation in German sports was further limited, and persecution of Jews started to become ever more lethal. The Olympic Games provided a nine-month period of relative calmness.

Antisemitism 

The German Olympic committee, in accordance with Nazi directives, virtually barred Germans who were Jewish or Roma or had such an ancestry from participating in the Games (Helene Mayer, who had one Jewish parent, was the only German Jew to compete at the Berlin Games). This decision meant exclusion for many of the country's top athletes such as shotputter and discus thrower Lilli Henoch, who was a four-time world record holder and 10-time German national champion, and Gretel Bergmann who was suspended from the German team just days after she set a record of 1.60 meters in the high jump.

Individual Jewish athletes from a number of countries chose to boycott the Berlin Olympics, including South African Sid Kiel, and Americans Milton Green and Norman Cahners. In the United States, the American Jewish Congress and the Jewish Labor Committee supported a boycott.

Boycott debate 
Prior to and during the Games, there was considerable debate outside Germany over whether the competition should be allowed or discontinued. Berlin had been selected by the IOC as the host city in 1931 during the Weimar Republic, but after Adolf Hitler's rise to power in 1933, observers in many countries began to question the morality of going ahead with an Olympic Games hosted by the Nazi regime. A number of brief campaigns to boycott or relocate the Games emerged in the United Kingdom, France, Sweden, Czechoslovakia, the Netherlands, and the United States. Exiled German political opponents of Hitler's regime also campaigned against the Berlin Olympics through pro-Communist newspapers such as the Arbeiter-Illustrierte-Zeitung.

The protests were ultimately unsuccessful; forty-nine teams from around the world participated in the 1936 Games, the largest number of participating nations of any Olympics to that point.

France 
Fencer Albert Wolff qualified for the French Olympic Team but boycotted the 1936 Summer Olympics, withdrawing from France's national team on principle because he was Jewish. He said: "I cannot participate in anything sponsored by Adolf Hitler, even for France."

Spain 

The Spanish government led by the newly elected left-wing Popular Front boycotted the Games and organized the People's Olympiad as a parallel event in Barcelona. Some 6,000 athletes from 49 "national" delegations registered. However, the People's Olympiad was aborted because of the outbreak of the Spanish Civil War just one day before the event was due to start.

Soviet Union 
The Soviet Union had not participated in international sporting events since the 1920 Olympics. The Soviet government was not invited to the 1920 Games, with the Russian Civil War still raging, and they did not participate in the 1924 Olympics and forward on ideological grounds. Instead, through the auspices of the Red Sport International, it had participated in a left-wing workers' alternative, the Spartakiad, since 1928. The USSR had intended to attend the People's Olympiad in Barcelona until it was cancelled; the Soviets did attend the Spartakiad-sponsored 1937 Workers' Summer Olympiad in Antwerp, Belgium. The Soviet Union started competing in the Olympics in 1952, when Soviet leaders realized that they could use the event to fulfil their political and ideological agenda.

Turkey 
Halet Çambel and Suat Fetgeri Așani, the first Turkish and Muslim women athletes to participate in the Olympics (fencing), refused an offer by their guide to be formally introduced to Adolf Hitler, saying they would not shake hands with him due to his approach to Jews, as stated by Ms. Çambel in a Milliyet newspaper interview in 2000.

United States 

Traditionally, the United States sent one of the largest teams to the Olympics, and there was a considerable debate over whether the nation should participate in the 1936 Games.

Those involved in the debate on whether to boycott the Olympics included Ernest Lee Jahncke, Judge Jeremiah T. Mahoney, and future IOC President Avery Brundage. Some within the United States considered requesting a boycott of the Games, as to participate in the festivity might be considered a sign of support for the Nazi regime and its antisemitic policies. However, others such as Brundage (see below) argued that the Olympic Games should not reflect political views, but rather should be strictly a contest of the greatest athletes.

Brundage, then of the United States Olympic Committee, opposed the boycott, stating that Jewish athletes were being treated fairly and that the Games should continue. Brundage asserted that politics played no role in sports, and that they should never be entwined. Brundage also believed that there was a "Jewish-Communist conspiracy" that existed to keep the United States from competing in the Olympic Games. Somewhat ironically, Brundage would be later accused of being a Soviet dupe for his controversial stance on the Soviet sports system that allowed them to circumvent the amateur rules. On the subject of Jewish discrimination, he stated, "The very foundation of the modern Olympic revival will be undermined if individual countries are allowed to restrict participation by reason of class, creed, or race."

During a fact-finding trip that Brundage went on to Germany in 1934 to ascertain whether German Jews were being treated fairly, Brundage found no discrimination when he interviewed Jews and his Nazi handlers translated for him, and Brundage commiserated with his hosts that he belonged to a sports club in Chicago that did not allow Jews entry, either.

Unlike Brundage, Mahoney supported a boycott of the Games. Mahoney, the president of the Amateur Athletic Union, led newspaper editors and anti-Nazi groups to protest against American participation in the Berlin Olympics. He contested that racial discrimination was a violation of Olympic rules and that participation in the Games was tantamount to support for the Third Reich.

Most African-American newspapers supported participation in the Olympics. The Philadelphia Tribune and the Chicago Defender both agreed that black victories would undermine Nazi views of Aryan supremacy and spark renewed African-American pride. American Jewish organizations, meanwhile, largely opposed the Olympics. The American Jewish Congress and the Jewish Labor Committee staged rallies and supported the boycott of German goods to show their disdain for American participation. The JLC organized the World Labor Athletic Carnival, held on 15 and 16 August at New York's Randall's Island, to protest the holding of the 1936 Olympics in Nazi Germany.

Eventually, Brundage won the debate, convincing the Amateur Athletic Union to close a vote in favor of sending an American team to the Berlin Olympics. Mahoney's efforts to incite a boycott of the Olympic games in the United States failed.

US President Franklin Delano Roosevelt and his administration did not become involved in the debate, due to a tradition of allowing the US Olympic Committee to operate independently of government influence. However, several American diplomats including William E. Dodd, the American ambassador to Berlin, and George Messersmith, head of the US legation in Vienna, deplored the US Olympic Committee's decision to participate in the games.

Last surviving competitor 
Upon the death of Joan Langdon on March 15, 2022, Iris Cummings became the last surviving competitor of the 1936 Summer Olympics.

Gallery

See also 

 Olympic Games Decoration
 Race (2016 film)
 National Socialist League of the Reich for Physical Exercise

Notes

References

Further reading 
 Barry, James P. The Berlin Olympics. World Focus Books.
 Grix, Jonathan, and Barrie Houlihan. "Sports mega-events as part of a nation's soft power strategy: The cases of Germany (2006) and the UK (2012)." British journal of politics and international relations 16.4 (2014): 572–596. online 
 Hilton, Christopher. Hitler's Olympics: The 1936 Berlin Olympic Games. (2006)
 Krüger, Arnd. The Nazi Olympics of 1936, in Kevin Young and Kevin B. Wamsley (eds.), Global Olympics: Historical and Sociological Studies of the Modern Games. Oxford: Elsevier 2005; pp. 43–58.
 Krüger, Arnd, and William Murray (eds.), The Nazi Olympics: Sport, Politics and Appeasement in the 1930s. (Univ. of Illinois Press 2003).
 Lehrer, Steven. Hitler Sites: A City-by-city Guidebook (Austria, Germany, France, United States). McFarland, 2002.
 Large, David Clay. Nazi games: the Olympics of 1936 (WW Norton & Company, 2007).
 Mandell, Richard D. The Nazi Olympics (University of Illinois Press, 1971).
 Rippon,  Anton. Hitler's Games: The 1936 Olympics. (2012) excerpt
 Socolow, Michael J.  Six Minutes in Berlin: Broadcast Spectacle and Rowing Gold at the Nazi Olympics. Urbana, IL: University of Illinois Press, 2016.
 Walters, Guy, Berlin Games – How Hitler Stole the Olympic Dream. (2006) excerpt

External links 

 
 Complete official IOC report. Part I 
 Complete official IOC report. Part II
 United States Holocaust Memorial Museum – Online Exhibition: Nazi Olympics: Berlin 1936
 United States Holocaust Memorial Museum – Library Bibliography: 1936 Olympics
 Virtual Library: the NAZI Olympics
 Die XI. Olympischen Sommerspiele in Berlin 1936 at Lebendiges Museum Online. In German
 1936 Olympics and the Struggle for Influence on C-SPAN
 The 1936 Olympic Games in Berlin, Germany
 Nazi Games at PBS International

 
Olympic Games in Germany
Summer Olympics by year
Summer Olympics
Olympic Games
Articles containing video clips
International sports boycotts
August 1936 sports events
Racism in sport